Hanna Vasylivna Maliar (born ) is a Ukrainian lawyer and educator who has been serving as one of the several Deputy Ministers of Defense under Prime Minister Denys Shmyhal since .  A graduate of the International Institute of Linguistics and Law in Kyiv, she was a docent at the same institute before she began working for the state.

Early life and education 

She graduated from Kyiv's International Institute of Linguistics and Law in 2000. She earned the right to practise law in 2007.

Career 

2010 — worked at the State Research Institute of Customs Affairs as deputy head of the Department of Legal Issues. 

From 2013 to 2020, she taught at the National School of Judges of Ukraine in the field of criminal-legal qualification of aggressive war and other crimes committed in war zones.

2018 — trainer of strategic communications units of the Security Service of Ukraine.

Since 2020, she has been a freelance consultant to the Verkhovna Rada Committee on National Security, Defense and Intelligence.

During the fourth month of the 2022 Russian invasion of Ukraine, Maliar stated that Russia's forces and firepower outsized Ukraine's by about a factor of ten.  Around , Maliar stated that it was not necessary to implement female conscription at the time, and that about 1000 women had voluntarily mobilized to date.

Personal life 

Hanna Maliar is married and has a son.

The author of more than 40 scientific works. Developed the concept of legal assessment of events in Crimea and eastern Ukraine, which is used in investigative and judicial practice.

Notes

References

External links 
 Ministerial profile on mil.gov.ua

1978 births
Living people
21st-century Ukrainian women politicians
Politicians from Kyiv
Women government ministers of Ukraine

uk:Маляр Ганна Василівна